The Struma or Strymónas ('black water') is a river in Bulgaria and Greece. Its ancient name was Strymṓn (Greek: Στρυμών ). It takes its source from the Vitosha Mountain in Bulgaria, runs first westward, then southward, forming a number of gorges, enters Greek territory at the Kula village. In Greece it is the main waterway feeding and exiting from Lake Kerkini, a significant centre for migratory wildfowl. The river flows into the Strymonian Gulf in Aegean Sea, near Amphipolis in the Serres regional unit.

Parts of the river valley belong to a Bulgarian (Pirin Macedonia) coal-producing area, more significant in the past than nowadays; the southern part of the Bulgarian section is an important wine region. The Greek portion is a valley which is dominant in agriculture, being Greece's fourth-biggest valley. The tributaries include the Konska River, the Dragovishtitsa, the Rilska River, the Blagoevgradska Bistritsa, the Sandanska Bistritsa, the Strumitsa, the Pirinska Bistritsa and the Angitis.

Etymology
The river's name comes from Thracian , derived from Proto-Indo-European * 'stream', akin to English stream, Old Irish  'river', Polish  'stream', Lithuanian straumuo 'fast stream', Bulgarian  'water flow', Greek  'stream', Albanian  'water flow',  'rain'.

The name Strymón was a hydronym in ancient Greek mythology, referring to a mythical Thracian king that was drowned in the river. Strymón was also used as a personal name in various regions of Ancient Greece during the 3rd century BC.

History

When Xerxes I of Persia crossed the river during his invasion in 480 BC he buried alive nine young boys and nine maidens as a sacrifice to the river god. The forces of Alexander I of Macedon defeated the remnants of Xerxes' army near Ennea Hodoi in 479 BC. In 424 BC the Spartan general Brasidas after crossing the entire Greek peninsula sieged and conquered Amphipolis. According to the ancient sources, the river was navigable from its mouth up to the ancient (and today dried) Cercinitis lake, which also favored the navigation; and thus was formed in antiquity an important waterway that served the communication between the coasts of Strymonian Gulf and the Thracian hinterland and almost to the city of Serres.

The decisive Battle of Kleidion was fought close the river in 1014 between the Bulgarians under Emperor Samuel and the Byzantines under Emperor Basil II and determined the fall of the First Bulgarian Empire four years later. In 1913, the Greek Army was nearly surrounded in the Kresna Gorge of the Struma by the Bulgarian Army during the Second Balkan War, and the Greeks were forced to ask for armistice. 

The river valley was part of the Macedonian front in World War I. The ship , which took Jewish refugees out of Romania in World War II and was torpedoed and sunk in the Black Sea, causing nearly 800 deaths, was named after the river.

Gallery

Honour
Struma Glacier on Livingston Island in the South Shetland Islands, Antarctica is named after Struma River.

Notes

External links 
 
 Livius.org: Strymon 

 
Rivers of Bulgaria
Rivers of Greece
International rivers of Europe
Landforms of Kyustendil Province
Landforms of Pernik Province
Landforms of Sofia City Province
Landforms of Serres (regional unit)
Geography of Macedonia (region)
Landforms of Central Macedonia